Joseph Mikulik, born October 30, 1963 in Weimar, Texas, is a former minor league baseball player and the former manager of the Asheville Tourists, Myrtle Beach Pelicans and  the Frisco RoughRiders minor league baseball teams. He is now the hitting coach for the Grand Junction Rockies of the MLB Partner Pioneer League . The 5' 11" right-handed outfielder never rose above AAA baseball, but was a key player in the Tucson Toros' first Pacific Coast League championship in 1991. During 2007, his eighth season with the Tourists, Mikulik, who already held the team record for most games managed, became the team's all-time leader in managerial wins.

Early life
Mikulik attended Bishop Forest High School in Schulenburg, Texas, with his brothers John and Gene Mikulik, where he lettered in football, baseball, basketball and track and field. He went on to play two years at San Jacinto College, where he would earn All-American honors. In 1984, he was drafted by the Houston Astros in the 9th round in the winter draft.

Playing history
Mikulik attended San Jacinto Junior College, where he was a walk-on and received a full scholarship. After an All-American sophomore season, Texas A&M offered him a two-year scholarship, which he declined when he was selected by the Houston Astros in the ninth round of the 1984 amateur draft. Over the next ten years he played for the Auburn Astros, the Asheville Tourists, the Columbus Astros and the Jackson Generals, all in the Astros' minor league system, supplemented with a stint in the Mexican League. From 1988 to 1992 he spent parts of each season with the AAA Tucson Toros, finally spending the entire season there in 1993.

Mikulik finished his career with a lifetime batting average of .279, 1265 career hits, 109 career home runs, 670 career RBIs, 161 stolen bases, and 742 runs.

Coaching history
In 1995, Mikulik coached the Canton-Akron Indians. He managed the Burlington Indians in 1997. He became manager of his previous team, the Asheville Tourists, in 2000. Mikulik won his 800th game with the Asheville Tourists on May 17, 2011, against Lexington and became the all-time leader in victories and games managed. In 2012, Mikulik lead the Tourists to the South Atlantic League Championship.

Mikulik is the hitting coach for the Grand Junction Rockies of the MLB Partner Pioneer League.

Meltdowns
Mikulik is infamous for several lengthy in-game tirades. In the bottom of the fifth inning in a game against the Lexington Legends on June 25, 2006, Mikulik instigated an argument with an umpire who had called Legends third baseman Koby Clemens safe on a close call at second base. The umpire ejected Mikulik who responded by going on an extended rampage. He dislodged second base and threw it into the outfield, threw bats from the dugout onto the field, then poured water on home plate before leaving for the clubhouse where he toppled water coolers and a chair in front of the umpires' locker room. Afterward, Mikulik was unapologetic, claiming he claimed he "could get two mannequins at Sears" could "umpire better than what I saw this whole series" while receiving a seven-day suspension and a $1,000 fine. His antics were shown on The Tonight Show with Jay Leno, Pardon the Interruption, SportsCenter, and Countdown with Keith Olbermann. Mikulik's behavior was mentioned in Legendary: When Baseball Came to the Bluegrass, a 2011 documentary about the Legends.

On July 27, 2012, in the bottom of the first inning of a game against the Charleston RiverDogs, Mikulik came out of the dugout to dispute a call that a baserunner had eluded a tag. Mikulik was ejected by an umpire after he argued, kicked dirt, and reenacted the play. Mikulik went back to argue with the umpiring crew, removed third base, and handed it to a fan. Mikulik left the game tipping his hat to the crowd as he received mixed applause.

Managing the Myrtle Beach Pelicans on August 17, 2014, Mikulik had a widely-reported meltdown where he responded to getting ejected by removing some of his clothing on the field.

Personal history
Mikulik has two children, son Dawson and daughter Susan. Mikulik married Candy Conway on October 13, 2014.

References

External links
Baseball Reference - minors
 Official bio from Asheville Tourists website

1963 births
Living people
Acereros de Monclova players
American expatriate baseball players in Mexico
Asheville Tourists managers
Asheville Tourists players
Auburn Astros players
Baseball outfielders
Baseball coaches from Texas
Baseball players from Texas
Columbus Astros players
Columbus Mudcats players
Diablos Rojos del México players
Jackson Generals (Texas League) players
Minor league baseball managers
Olmecas de Tabasco players
People from Weimar, Texas
Tucson Toros players